Stratford Career Institute (SCI) is a distance education school established in 1991 that offers at-home vocational training programs to students in North America. Stratford's corporate offices are located in Montreal, Quebec, Canada, with a U.S shipping/mailing office in St. Albans, Vermont.

Stratford offers more than 60 distance education courses with correspondence by mail, the Internet, or in combination. SCI markets its courses for the purposes of "personal development" to learn or improve skills that can be used to seek employment in a particular field or for personal enjoyment.

In February 2016, the U.S. Federal Trade Commission (FTC) filed a complaint against the school. The FTC alleged that the institute was misleading consumers about its high school program, which the FTC said failed to meet the basic requirements set by most U.S. states. SCI settled those claims in 2017, agreeing to cease making false claims about its programs, notify students that they could cancel their high school program enrollment, and not pursue debts owed by students for that program.

Accreditation
Stratford Career Institute does not hold any regional and national  educational accreditation that is recognized by the U.S. Department of Education or any Canadian accreditation agency.

References

External links
 Stratford Career Institute
Stratford Career Institute Canada

Distance education institutions based in Canada
Unaccredited institutions of higher learning in the United States